Tavella is an Italian family surname. The Tavella surname originated from Neapolitan or Old Italian tavella ‘board’, ‘plank’, ‘slab’ (from Latin tabella), presumably a nickname for someone who was tall and thin, or perhaps a metonymic occupational name for a woodworker. People with the surname include:

 Aylon Darwin Tavella (born 1992), Brazilian footballer 
 Carlo Antonio Tavella, Italian painter
 Dominick Tavella, American sound engineer
 Julia Ann (born 1969), adult film actress, born Julia Tavella
 Franz Tavella (La Val, 10 October 1844 – Bressanone, 12 December 1931) was an Austrian master wood sculptor.

External links
 http://www.answers.com/topic/tavella